The Rolex Oyster Perpetual Submariner is a line of sports watches designed for diving and manufactured by Rolex, resistant to water and corrosion. The first Submariner was introduced to the public in 1954 at the Basel Watch Fair. It was the first watch to be waterproof up to 100m. The Rolex Submariner is considered "a classic among wristwatches", manufactured by one of the most widely recognized luxury brands in the world. Due to its huge popularity, there are many homage watches by well-established watchmakers, as well as illegal counterfeits. The Rolex Submariner is part of Rolex's Oyster Perpetual line.

Today, the Submariner and Submariner Date models are equipped with Rolex Calibres 3230 and 3235, respectively, and feature luminescent hour markers, a unidirectional rotatable bezel with Cerachrom ceramic insert, and a solid-link Oyster bracelet. They are water resistant up to 300 metres (1000 ft).

Early models
The Submariner model went into production in 1953 and was showcased at the Basel Watch Fair in 1954. The assigned case reference number of this first Submariner was either 6204 or 6205. It is unclear which model came first; in any event, the two watches are nearly identical.
Neither has the distinctive "cathedral" or "Mercedes" hands now so strongly associated with the Submariner line. Rather, both of these early submariners have straight "pencil" style hands.
Few, if any, of the 6205 watches bear the name "Submariner" on the dial, a major distinction of modern Submariners. Some 6204 models have the Submariner logo printed below the center pinion, while others have the logo blacked out. It is believed that there were unexpected trademark issues connected with the name "Submariner" at the time the 6204 and 6205 were released, accounting for the inconsistent use of the Submariner mark on these early Submariners. Trademark irregularities notwithstanding, both the 6204 and 6205 are designated Submariner models in Rolex product literature.

In 1954, Rolex also produced a small number of ref. 6200 Submariners. This was the first Submariner (although not the first Rolex) to make use of the Mercedes hand set, a feature of all subsequent Submariners. The 6200 also featured an oversized winding crown compared to the 6204 and 6205 models. Within a few years, Rolex revised its Submariner line, producing the 6536 (small crown) and 6538 (oversized crown) models. These watches had "improved" movements (the cal. 1030), including a chronometer version in some 6536 models (designated 6536/1), the now-familiar Mercedes hands, and the Submariner logo and depth rating printed on the dial.

By the early 1960s, these models had given way to the 5508 (small crown) and 5510 (large crown) models. All of these early Submariners used either gilt (6200, 6204, 6205) or gilt/silver gilt (6536, 6538) printing on glossy black dials. Radium paint was used for the luminous indices.

The next wave of Submariners, the 5512 (chronometer version) and 5513 (non-chronometer), marked a significant change in the appearance of the popular Rolex design. "Shoulders" were added to the crown side of the case to provide protection for the winding/setting mechanism. In early watches—until 1964 or so—these shoulders were pyramid-shaped and ended in points. Later watches were manufactured with rounded shoulders. The 5512 and 5513 were both fitted with the oversized crown, which thereafter became a standard feature of the Submariner line. In the early 1960s, Rolex discontinued the use of radium paint for the luminous indices, switching to safer tritium-infused paint.

In 1965–1966, Rolex discontinued use of gilt/silver gilt dials on the Submariner watches, switching to white printing. A final important change came with the introduction of the 1680 model in the late 1960s: the 1680 was the first Submariner to be equipped with a date function, marking the completion of the transition of the Submariner line from specialist tool watch to mass market fashion accessory. While many professional and military divers used—and continue to use—Submariners in the most demanding underwater environments, by the late 1960s, the watch had undeniably become a mass market product as well.

Later models 
Throughout the next 40 years, the Submariner was updated with improved water resistance, new movements, and numerous small cosmetic changes. In 2003, Rolex celebrated the Submariner's 50th anniversary by launching the Rolex Submariner-Date anniversary edition (16610 LV), with distinguishing features such as the green bezel and Maxi dial; its production ended in 2010 with the final watches being issued with the new "random" serial number. In 2008, a new case from the GMT II was introduced for the Submariner-Date, featuring heavier lugs and crownguard; a Cerachrom bezel and updated clasp featuring a quick adjust function were also added. The 14060M did not have these modifications.

A new Submariner-Date, model 116613 (not to be confused with model 16613), based on the "supercase" used in the GMT Master II, was presented at the 2008 Basel show. The first Submariner-Date models offered were a yellow gold with blue face and bezel and a new white gold with blue face and bezel. The stainless steel case model was presented at the 2010 Basel show. Its reference is 116610.

At the 2012 BaselWorld watch show, an updated Submariner ref 114060 was introduced. It replaced the 14060M, with newer "Maxi Case" with "Chromalight" hour markers, ceramic bezel, blue Parachrom hairspring and bracelet with "Glidelock" extension system.

Like the watch case, the lug width has also been increased by 1 mm to 

Also in 2020, two new movements became available for new "41 mm" models. For No - Date model caliber 3230 and for date models, the caliber is called 3235. Both are COSC certified.

Usage 

From 1970 onwards, the French diving company COMEX received a special version of Rolex Submariner 5513 featuring a helium release valve for their saturation divers. This version of the Submariner was based on the Sea Dweller and not the other way around as often claimed. In 1974, the first double-signed dials featuring the Comex logo were introduced followed by changing the reference number to 5514, thus creating an exclusive reference for Comex. These watches were never available to the public.

Current models 

All models feature 300-meter (1000 feet) water resistance.

Discontinued models

Submariner spinoff 
The Rolex Sea-Dweller, developed in 1967 but introduced to the general public in 1971, is a heavier-duty steel version of the Submariner, with a thicker case and crystal, as well as a date feature, sans the (Lens#Types_of_simple_lensesplano-convex) date magnifying lens ("cyclops").

The Sea-Dweller was superseded by the DeepSea Sea-Dweller in late 2008, with the last 16600 Sea-Dwellers produced running into the V-series (late 2008).

In late 2022 Rolex introduced the Deepsea Challenge, a commercial full ocean depth capable watch featuring a 50 mm titanium alloy case. The Deepsea Challenge model does not feature a date complication unlike the Deepsea and Sea-Dweller models, which were designed for saturation diving were people have to spend multiple days in pressurized environments.

Model information and characteristics
Waterproof to a maximum depth of 300 metres (1000 ft).
Triplock system waterproof crown, featuring a triple gasket system, identified by three dots on the crown. Screws down tightly onto the case tube and against the Oyster case to provide extra waterproof protection for underwater diving.
Case made from solid block of 904L stainless steel, a corrosion-resistant alloy, or gold. The golds (white or yellow) are made in Rolex's own foundry.
 Unidirectional bezel that enables a diver to memorize and follow immersion time. As the bezel only rotates counterclockwise, the dive time can only become "longer" in case of accidental bezel movement, averting the danger of spending too much time underwater.
Perpetual rotor in the self-winding wristwatch mechanism, allowing the watch to run continuously, as every slight movement of the wrist winds the movement. The energy generated is stored in the mainspring, allowing the watch to continue to function with no movement for several days. Each movement is a Swiss chronometer officially certified by the COSC.
Rolex calendar mechanism that advances to the next date at midnight in a single short rotation.
Removable hologram on the caseback, featured until 2007.
Recent models of the Submariner and Submariner-Date (late 2008) feature a distinctive "ROLEX ROLEX ROLEX" and serial number engraved on the "inner bezel", also known as the "Rehaut" (French) or "Flange" (English). It also contains a minuscule laser-etched Rolex Crown at the bottom of the crystal in line with 6 o'clock mark.
Over the years, Submariner models have been assigned nicknames by the watch collecting community to distinguish one reference from the other. These names include: 'James Bond', 'Single Red' , 'Double Red', 'Smurf' , 'Bart Simpson', 'Kermit', 'Starbucks', 'Hulk', 'The Bluesy'

James Bond
The Rolex Submariner has appeared in a number of James Bond movies. Sean Connery wore a reference 6538 in his first four movies. In Dr. No. and From Russia with Love, the watch was used with a leather strap, favored by real life spy, Matt West while in Goldfinger and Thunderball the strap had been swapped for an undersized NATO type nylon band (The Ministry of Defence "G10" strap not being commissioned until 1973, and then only in admiralty grey without stripes). George Lazenby wore a reference 5513 with an oyster bracelet in parts of On Her Majesty's Secret Service, as did Roger Moore in his first two movies Live and Let Die and The Man with the Golden Gun, but with a 7206 "riveted"' bracelet. Timothy Dalton is so far the last Bond actor to wear a Rolex in the Bond franchise. He is seen wearing a Submariner with a date window in his last film Licence to Kill. The watch is arguably a 16800 or 168000, as the movie was shot in the summer of 1988. From GoldenEye onwards, James Bond wears Omega Seamasters.

Related pages 

 Rolex Daytona
 Rolex Day-Date
 Rolex Datejust
 Rolex GMT Master II
 Rolex Milgauss
 Rolex Sea Dweller
 Rolex Yacht-Master

References

External links
Rolex:Submariner
Rolex Submariner Ref. 114060 Review

Rolex watches
Products introduced in 1953